Alfred Murray (4 February 1868 – 27 July 1936) was an Australian cricketer. He played five first-class cricket matches for Victoria between 1897 and 1901.

Murray began his cricket career in Bendigo playing for the Bendigo United Cricket Club but later moved to Melbourne where he played for East Melbourne in district cricket. He was primarily a batsman but also bowled "googly" spin. He was selected to represent Victoria and highlights of his state career included a 187 run partnership with Peter McAlister against New Zealand in 1899 and scoring a century against Tasmania in 1900.

In his professional career Murray worked for the Victorian Railways Department and eventually became chief clerk of the Railways Workshops in Bendigo before retiring in 1928. In his personal life he had a daughter and three sons.

See also
 List of Victoria first-class cricketers

References

External links
 

1868 births
1936 deaths
Australian cricketers
Victoria cricketers
Sportspeople from Bendigo